The 2003 MercedesCup was a men's tennis tournament played on outdoor clay courts at the Tennis Club Weissenhof in Stuttgart, Germany and was part of the International Series Gold of the 2003 ATP Tour. The tournament was held from 14 July until 20 July 2003. Guillermo Coria won the singles.

Finals

Singles

 Guillermo Coria defeated  Tommy Robredo 6–2, 6–2, 6–1
 It was Coria's 2nd title of the year and the 3rd of his career.

Doubles

 Tomáš Cibulec /  Pavel Vízner defeated  Yevgeny Kafelnikov /  Kevin Ullyett 3–6, 6–3, 6–4
 It was Cibulec's 2nd title of the year and the 3rd of his career. It was Vízner's 2nd title of the year and the 5th of his career.

References

External links
 Official website 
 ITF tournament edition details
 ATP tournament profile

Stuttgart Open
Stuttgart Open
2003 in German tennis